The A6, also known as the Autoroute du Soleil, Motorway of the Sun, (along with the A7), is an Autoroute in France, linking Paris to Lyon. The motorway starts at Paris's Porte d'Orléans and Porte d'Italie with two branches, numbered A6a and A6b respectively, that join south of Paris. The motorway is favoured by holidaymakers as it is the main link to the South of France and the French Riviera. At 455 km long it is France's third longest autoroute after the A10 autoroute and the A4 autoroute.

The A6 motorway used to be prone to severe traffic jams around Fourvière Tunnel near Lyon prior to the opening in 1992 of A46 autoroute and in 2011 of the A432 autoroute which is also called the "Contournement de Lyon" and known as the "Lyon Rocade Est".

A 200-kilometre (120-mile) stretch of the A6 motorway around Mâcon, Chalon-sur-Saône and Montceau-les-Mines, France, is known for the A6 disappearances, a number of mysterious disappearances or other crimes involving women and girls, occurring in the 1980s, 1990s and 2000s.

Exit list 

Exits are numbered from north to south.

A6b

References

External links 

 A6 autoroute in Saratlas
 A6 APRR, the operator of the A6

A06